University is an unincorporated census-designated place in Hillsborough County, Florida, United States. The population was 41,163 at the 2010 census, up from 30,736 at the 2000 census. The University of South Florida is located just southeast of the community, within the Tampa city limits. The community is also known as "University West", mainly due to its location in relation to the university. The community is often notoriously referred to by locals as "Suitcase City" due to the high rate of transients.

Description 
University is bounded by Interstate 275 to the west, Tampa city limits to the south and east, including the University of South Florida, and Sinclair Hills Road to the north. Its historical boundaries stretch as far east as Morris Bridge Road; however, the boundaries were scaled back owing to annexations by Tampa and Temple Terrace during the 1980s.

Economy 
University Mall, a shopping center located at the southern end of the community, was the main source of economic development within the community during the 1970s and '80s. The businesses that were concentrated in the mall have been replaced by many stand-alone shops along Fowler and Fletcher avenues, such as Wal-Mart, Target and dozens of fast food establishments. There is a county bus transportation center operated by HARTline and a county health department located in the area. Fletcher east has become a hub of medical and dental groups adjacent to Florida Hospital Tampa.

Geography
University is located in northern Hillsborough County at  (28.069644, -82.437091). The community of Lake Magdalene is to the west, and Lutz is to the north. The CDP includes the area known as Nowatney.

Demographics

As of the census of 2010, there were 41,163 people living in the community. The racial composition of the community is 33.6% Non-Hispanic White, 32.8% Black, 29.1% Hispanic or Latino, 0.6% Native American, 3.8% Asian, 0.1% Pacific Islander, 6.37% from other races, and 4% from two or more races.

There were 13,623 households, out of which 24.9% had children under the age of 18 living with them, 18.1% were married couples living together, 18.4% had a female householder with no husband present, and 57.8% were non-families. 41.7% of all households were made up of individuals, and 7.1% had someone living alone who was 65 years of age or older.  The average household size was 2.12 and the average family size was 2.96.

In the community the population was spread out, with 22.8% under the age of 18, 22.1% from 18 to 24, 32.5% from 25 to 44, 12.1% from 45 to 64, and 10.5% who were 65 years of age or older.  The median age was 27 years. For every 100 females, there were 97.4 males.  For every 100 females age 18 and over, there were 94.8 males.

The median income for a household in the community was $22,090, and the median income for a family was $24,094. Males had a median income of $22,419 versus $20,219 for females. The per capita income for the community was $13,417.  About 24.8% of families and 31.3% of the population were below the poverty line, including 39.6% of those under age 18 and 14.0% of those age 65 or over.

References

External links
University Community Website
   A newspaper article about the University community

Census-designated places in Hillsborough County, Florida
Census-designated places in Florida